Baik Kang Jin is a South Korean judge and member of the Khmer Rouge Tribunal. He was formerly a judge at the Seoul High Court and a special commissioner of the Presidential Council on Intellectual Property.

References

Living people
Year of birth missing (living people)
Khmer Rouge Tribunal judges
South Korean judges
Place of birth missing (living people)
Seoul National University alumni